"I Miss You" is a single released by the Australian singer-songwriter Darren Hayes from his first solo album, Spin. The track was the album's third single in the United Kingdom and its fourth single in Australia, released after "Crush (1980 Me)" in 2003.

Background and release
The song's protagonist describes how he feels when he is away from the one he loves. The song contains the repetitive phrase "Give me a reason...".

The song debuted at #20 on the UK Singles Chart and at #25 on the Australian ARIA Chart. The music video shows Hayes performing in a diner and flashbacks of him and his lover. At the end, he is reunited with her. In Australia, a music video was also released for the Dallas Austin Mix. This video has the Australian actress Rose Byrne. The UK and European releases of the song included a version of the 1986 Peter Gabriel song "In Your Eyes".

Track listings
 Australia
 "I Miss You" (Dallas Austin Mix) – 3:28
 "I Miss You" (radio edit) – 3:31
 "Crush (1980 Me)" (Crush on Holiday Remix) – 4:24
 "Where You Want to Be" (original demo recording) – 6:21

 UK CD1
 "I Miss You" (radio edit) – 3:30
 "Strange Relationship" (F3 Remix) – 3:50
 "In Your Eyes" – 4:47
 "I Miss You" (CD-ROM video)

 UK CD2
 "I Miss You" (album version) – 5:31
 "Where You Want to Be" (original demo recording) – 6:12
 "I Miss You" (instrumental) – 3:31

 UK Cassette
 "I Miss You" (album version) – 5:31
 "Where You Want to Be" (original demo recording) – 6:12

 Europe
 "I Miss You" (radio edit) – 3:30
 "Strange Relationship" (F3 Remix) – 3:50
 "In Your Eyes" – 4:47
 "Insatiable" (acoustic) – 5:20
 "I Miss You" (CD-ROM video)

Chart performance

Peak positions

References

External links
Darren Hayes – I Miss You music video
Darren Hayes' official site

2002 singles
2003 singles
Darren Hayes songs
Pop ballads
Songs written by Walter Afanasieff
Songs written by Darren Hayes
2001 songs
Columbia Records singles